The Halifax Regional Centre for Education (formerly Halifax Regional School Board) is the public school district responsible for 136 elementary, junior high, and high schools located in the Halifax Regional Municipality in Halifax County, Nova Scotia, Canada. The current Regional Executive Director is Elwin LeRoux. The district's office is on Spectacle Lake Drive, Dartmouth. The district's stated vision is "to provide a high quality education to every student every day". On January 24, 2018, the provincial government announced would be dissolved and education administered by an appointed provincial council and the board was dissolved on March 31, 2018.

History

The board was created in 1996 with the amalgamation of three school boards that had jurisdiction over the former components of the Halifax Regional Municipality, which was created at the same time. Board elections have taken place in 1996, 2000, 2004, 2008 and 2012.

2006 board dismissal
On December 19, 2006, the Minister of Education, Karen Casey, dismissed all 13 members of the board due to interpersonal conflicts and having failed to comply with their Code of Ethics. The minister stated, "This board has failed to meet the performance standards set out under Section 64 (6) of the Education Act. Sec. 64 states that a school board, in carrying out its responsibilities under this act, shall meet education program services and performance standards established by the minister." Seven of the  former Halifax Regional School Board members are considering legal action against the government for disbanding the elected group.

Howard Windsor, a former deputy minister, was appointed to act as the board until the municipal elections took place in October 2008. Mr. Windsor decided to discontinue their yearly stipends of $8,200, stating: "I respect the work done by the previous board members, but I see no reason to continue to pay them when they have neither the responsibility nor the authority to act on the public’s behalf." Windsor was replaced by a nine-member elected Board during regularly scheduled elections in 2008.

2018 dissolution
On January 23, 2018, education consultant Avis Glaze presented a report on the province's school system to government that included the recommendation that the seven elected regional school boards become regional education offices overseen by appointed provincial advisory council. On January 24, 2018, the provincial government announced it accepted the recommendation and the Halifax Regional School Board and six other school boards would be dissolved though no date for dissolution was then announced. The elected school board was dissolved on March 31, 2018.

Personnel

Superintendents
 Don Trider (1996–1999)
 David Reid (1999–2002)
 Carole Olsen (2002–2012)
 Judy White Interim (2012–2013)
 Elwin LeRoux (2013–2018)

Regional Executive Director
 Elwin LeRoux (2018–2002)
 Steve Gallagher (Acting) (2022–present)

Schools

High schools 

 Auburn Drive High School
 Bay View High School
 Charles P. Allen High School
 Citadel High School
 Cole Harbour District High School
 Dartmouth High School (Grades 9–12)
 Duncan MacMillan High School (Grades Primary-12)
 Eastern Shore District High School
 Halifax West High School
 Island View High School (Grades 9–12)
 J.L. Ilsley High School (Grades 9–12)
 Lockview High School (Grades 9–12)
 Millwood High School (Grades 9–12)
 Musquodoboit Rural High School (Grades 7–12)
 Sackville High School (Grades 9–12)
 Woodlawn High School

Junior high schools 

 Astral Drive Junior High School
 A. J. Smeltzer Junior High School (Grades 6–8)
 Bicentennial School (Grades Primary-9)
 Brookside Junior High (Grades 6–9)
 Caledonia Junior High
 Clayton Park Junior High
 Cunard Junior High (Grades 5–8)
 Eastern Passage Education Centre
 Elizabeth Sutherland School (Grades Primary-8)
 Ellenvale Junior High
 Eric Graves Junior High
 Fairview Junior High
 Five Bridges Junior High (Grades 6–9)
 Gaetz Brook Junior High
 Georges P. Vanier Junior High (Grades 6–8)
 Gorsebrook Junior High School
 Graham Creighton Junior High School
 Halifax Central Junior High (formerly Cornwallis Junior High)
 Harold T. Barrett Junior High (Grades 6–8)
 Herring Cove Junior High (Grades 6–8)
 Highland Park Junior High
 John Martin Junior High
 Leslie Thomas Junior High (Grades 6–8)
 Madeline Symonds Middle School (Grades 6–9)
 Ecole Oxford School|Oxford School (Grades Primary-9)
 Oyster Pond Academy (Grades Primary-9)
 Park West School (Grades Primary-9)
 Prince Arthur Junior High
 Ross Road School (Grades Primary-9)
 Sackville Heights Junior High (Grades 6–8)
 Sir Robert Borden Junior High School
 St. Agnes Junior High
 Rockingstone Heights (Grades Primary-8)
 Rocky Lake Junior High School
 Ridgecliff Middle School (Grades 6–9)

Elementary schools 

 Admiral Westphal Elementary
 Alderney Elementary
 Ash Lee Jefferson Elementary
 Astral Drive Elementary
 Atlantic Memorial - Terence Bay Elementary (Atlantic Memorial)
 Atlantic Memorial - Terence Bay Elementary (Terence Bay)
 Atlantic View Elementary
 Basinview Drive Community School
 Beaver Bank-Kinsac Elementary
 Beaver Bank-Monarch Drive Elementary
 Bedford South School
 Beechville Lakeside Timberlea Jr Elementary
 Beechville Lakeside Timberlea Sr Elementary
 Bel Ayr Elementary
 Bell Park Academic Centre
 Brookhouse Elementary
 Burton Ettinger Elementary
 Caldwell Road Elementary
 Caudle Park Elementary
 Cavalier Drive School
 Central Spryfield Elementary
 Chebucto Heights Elementary
 Colby Village Elementary
 Colonel John Stuart Elementary
 Crichton Park Elementary
 Duc d'Anville Elementary
 Dutch Settlement Elementary
 East St. Margaret's Elementary
 Fairview Heights Elementary (Annex Building)
 Fairview Heights Elementary (Main Building)
 George Bissett Elementary
 Grosvenor-Wentworth Park Elementary
 Hammonds Plains Consolidated Elementary
 Harbour View Elementary
 Harrietsfield Elementary
 Harry R. Hamilton Elementary
 Hawthorn Elementary
 Hillside Park Elementary
 Holland Road Elementary
 Humber Park Elementary
 Horizon Elementary
 Ian Forsyth Elementary
 Inglis Street Elementary
 John MacNeil Elementary
 John W. MacLeod - Fleming Tower Elem. (Fleming Tower)
 John W. MacLeod - Fleming Tower Elem. (John W. MacLeod)
 Joseph Giles Elementary
 Joseph Howe Elementary
 Kingswood Elementary
 LeMarchant-St. Thomas Elementary
 Michael Wallace Elementary
 Millwood Elementary
 Mount Edward Elementary
 Musquodoboit Valley Education Centre
 Nelson Whynder Elementary
 O'Connell Drive Elementary
 Ocean View Elementary
 Oldfield Consolidated Elementary
 Porters Lake Elementary
 Portland Estates Elementary
 Prospect Road Elementary
 Robert Kemp Turner Elementary
 Rockingham Elementary
 Sackville Heights Elementary
 Saint Mary's Elementary
 Sambro Elementary
 Seaside Elementary
 Shannon Park Elementary
 Shatford Memorial Elementary
 Sir Charles Tupper Elementary
 Smokey Drive Elementary
 South Woodside Elementary
 Springvale Elementary
 St. Catherine's Elementary
 St. Joseph's-Alexander McKay Elementary
 St. Margaret's Bay Elementary
 St. Stephen's Elementary
 Sunnyside Elementary (Eaglewood Drive)
 Sunnyside Elementary (Fort Sackville)
 Sycamore Lane Elementary
 Tantallon Jr Elementary
 Tantallon Sr Elementary
 Upper Musquodoboit Consolidated Elem.
 Waverley Memorial
 Westmount Elementary
 William King Elementary

See also
Education in Canada
List of Nova Scotia schools

References

External links
 

1996 establishments in Nova Scotia
Education in Halifax, Nova Scotia
School districts in Nova Scotia